The Rogues is a group of supervillains from the comic book superhero the Flash, currently led by Captain Cold and including the Mirror Master, Heat Wave, the Golden Glider, the Weather Wizard, the Trickster, the Pied Piper, the Top, and Captain Boomerang. This loose criminal association refer to themselves as the "Rogues", disdaining the use of the term "supervillain" or "supercriminal".

Fictional team history
The Rogues, compared to similar collections of supervillains in the DC Universe, are an unusually social group, maintaining a code of conduct as well as high standards for acceptance. No Rogue may inherit another Rogue's identity (a "legacy" villain, for example) while the original still lives. Also, simply acquiring a former Rogue's costume, gear, or abilities is not sufficient to become a Rogue, even if the previous Rogue is already dead. They do not kill anyone unless it is absolutely necessary. Additionally, the Rogues refrain from drug usage.

Although they tend to lack the wider name recognition of the villains who oppose Batman and Superman, the enemies of the Flash form a distinctive rogues gallery through their unique blend of colorful costumes, diverse powers, and unusual abilities. They lack any one defining element or theme between them, and have no significant ambitions in their criminal enterprises beyond relatively petty robberies.

The New 52: The Flash and Forever Evil (2011–2016)
The Rogues are referenced by Barry Allen to have previously been defeated by him and disbanded. Known members (so far) have been the Golden Glider, the Weather Wizard, Heat Wave, and the Mirror Master.

The Rogues appeared in The Flash (vol. 4) Annual #1 in a war against Captain Cold, the Flash, and the Pied Piper. Confirmed Rogues include the Golden Glider (Lisa Snart) as the current leader, the Weather Wizard (Marco Mardon), the Trickster (Axel Walker), Heat Wave (Mick Rory), and the Mirror Master (Sam Scudder).
 
A year prior, Captain Cold, Heat Wave, the Mirror Master (Sam Scudder again), and the Weather Wizard underwent a procedure at an unknown facility that would merge them with their weapons, giving them superpowers. The procedure went awry and exploded. Cold's sister Lisa, who was also at the facility, was caught in the explosion. The five were given superpowers, but each in a twisted manner. Heat Wave gained pyrokinesis, but at the cost of his body being burned; the Weather Wizard becomes emotionally tied to his weather wand, causing constant depression; Lisa becomes an astral projection of herself; and Sam would be forever trapped in the Mirror World. The Rogues blamed Cold for this and turned against him. However, they are forced to team up with the Flash, Cold, and the Pied Piper when Gorilla Grodd invaded Central City. As of Forever Evil, they seem to be working together again.

Silver Age Flash enemies
The enemies of the Flash started to use the name the Rogues during the Silver Age of Comics. Originally, the Rogues were just the Flash's enemies teaming together after they were all broken out of jail by another Flash foe, the super-intelligent gorilla Gorilla Grodd, to distract the Flash during Grodd's latest attempt at world conquest. After their defeat by the Flash, they formed a lasting group, and usually a Rogue will never commit a crime by himself. The Silver Age Flash enemies who became Rogues were Captain Cold, the Mirror Master, Heat Wave, the Weather Wizard, the Trickster, the Pied Piper, the Top, Captain Boomerang, the Golden Glider and later, the Rainbow Raider. These villains battled the second Flash (Barry Allen), and the third and fourth Flashes after Allen's death.

In chronological order (with issue and date of first appearance):

Modern Age Flash enemies
In the Modern Age, the graphic novel The Flash: Iron Heights introduced new characters, many of whom would later become a new band of Rogues under the leadership of the crimelord Blacksmith. Some writers revamped classic Rogues, reinventing them through stories such as Underworld Unleashed, the Rogue War, or solo stories, while others reinvented a Rogue through new characters inheriting the identities. While criminals, the Rogues have been shown to have certain codes of honor about their behavior (such as refusing to kill women or children) and have even stated that they will not kill speedsters.

Blacksmith's Rogues

Related teams

The New Rogues
The New Rogues is a gang that was formed by the Penguin during the "Gotham Underground" storyline where they have similar weaponry as the Rogues. The group consists of Chill, the Mirror Man (who has no connection to the Batman villain of the same name), Mr. Magic, and the Weather Witch, with Dick Grayson in his alias of Freddie Dinardo operating as Burn.

During the events of Final Crisis, the Rogues rejected membership into the Secret Society offered by Libra. With Libra desperate to induct all of the Flash's villains, he recruits the New Rogues to force the Rogues to join. In addition, they have a new Burn with them who left Paul Gambi for dead, as noted by Heat Wave. The New Rogues had captured Captain Cold's father and were threatening to kill him if the Rogues did not report to Libra. The Rogues then attacked the New Rogues, killing each one of them.

The Renegades
The Renegades are policemen from the 25th century. They are all part of the "Reverse-Flash Task Force". In The Flash (vol. 3) #1, a Mirror Master's body is dumped in a public area by a shadowy figure in a Flash suit. Barry Allen arrives in his civilian attire and confirms that the dead man was not the real Mirror Master. The Flash arrives on the top of a building, where he is confronted by the Renegades, futuristic versions of the current Rogues. He is charged with the murder of Mirror Monarch by their leader, Commander Cold. The Renegades members include futuristic versions of Captain Cold, Heat Wave, the Mirror Master, the Weather Wizard, the Trickster, and the Top. It is revealed over the course of the investigation that the Top had actually framed the Flash to prevent Barry from opening up a cold case that would reveal that the Top's ancestor had committed a murder that an innocent man had been locked away for, as having a criminal in his family would prevent the Top from becoming a member of the Renegades.

The Renegades return in the DC Rebirth era, still active in the 25th century, when they are sent back in time by a hooded man to arrest Iris West after she is identified as the killer of Eobard Thawne during a recent time-travel jaunt to their present, the masked man concluding that this will trigger a war between the Flashes to further his own agenda.

The Renegades appear with the alternate Flashes when it comes to the fight against Eobard Thawne and his Legion of Zoom.

Collected editions
<onlyinclude>

Other versions

Flashpoint
In the alternate timeline of the Flashpoint event, the Rogues are assembled by the Mirror Master, who asks the Weather Wizard, Tar Pit, the Trickster, and Fallout to team up against Citizen Cold, seeking revenge.

In other media

Television
 The Rogues appear in the Justice League Unlimited episode "Flash and Substance", consisting of Captain Cold, Mirror Master, Captain Boomerang, and the Trickster.
 The Rogues appear in the Batman: The Brave and the Bold episode "Requiem for a Scarlet Speedster!", consisting of Captain Cold, Heat Wave, and Weather Wizard.
 Several incarnations of the Rogues appear in The Flash.
 The first incarnation appears in the first and second seasons, consisting of Captain Cold, Heat Wave, and Golden Glider.
 In the fifth season, Silver Ghost intends to form the Young Rogues and recruits Weather Witch. However, the latter abandons her in Bolivia and forms the Young Rogues with XS, Bug-Eyed Bandit, and Rag Doll.
 The second incarnation appears in the ninth season, formed by the Red Death and consisting of Captain Boomerang, Fiddler, Murmur, Chillblaine, Rainbow Raider, and Gorilla Grodd. This version of the group wields equipment based on Wayne Enterprises designs.

Film
The Rogues appear in Justice League: The Flashpoint Paradox, consisting of Captain Cold, Heat Wave, Captain Boomerang, Top, and Mirror Master.

Video games
 The Rogues appear as bosses in Batman: The Brave and the Bold – The Videogame, consisting of Captain Cold, Heat Wave, and Weather Wizard.
 The Rogues appear as sub-bosses in DC Universe Online.
 The Rogues appear in Lego DC Super-Villains, consisting of Captain Cold, Heat Wave, Mirror Master, and Captain Boomerang. This version of the group are members of the Legion of Doom.

Miscellaneous
The Rogues appear in the Injustice: Gods Among Us prequel comic, led by Mirror Master and consisting of Golden Glider, Heat Wave, and Weather Wizard. Additionally, Captain Cold is said to be in hiding while Trickster appears as a former member. The Rogues are initially incarcerated until Plastic Man breaks them out to help Batman's Insurgency defeat Superman and his Regime. Despite their being criminals, Batman accepts them because they also follow a no-kill rule. Throughout their time with the Insurgency, the Rogues carry out attacks on Regime bases until they are attacked by Bizarro, who kills Heat Wave and Weather Wizard. Trickster, who was watching over them, arrives to distract Bizarro so Mirror Master and Glider can escape. The surviving Rogues later hold a memorial for their fallen teammates.

References

External links
 Alan Kistler's Profile On: The Flash A detailed analysis of the history of the Flash by comic book historian Alan Kistler. Covers information all the way from Jay Garrick to Barry Allen to today, as well as discussions on the various villains and Rogues who fought the Flash.
 Crimson Lightning  An online index to the comic book adventures of the Flash.

DC Comics supervillain teams
Flash (comics) characters
Lists of DC Comics characters
Characters created by Carmine Infantino
Characters created by John Broome